The Château de Boussan is a ruined castle in the commune of Boussan in the Haute-Garonne département of France.

The castle was built on a rocky outcrop dominating the valley of the Louge. It was abandoned in 1553. The only part remaining is a square tower with the top removed, to which is attached the wall of a residential building, a ditch and the remains of the church, itself in use later and abandoned in 1740.

The property of the commune, it has been listed since 1926 as a monument historique by the French Ministry of Culture.

See also
List of castles in France

References

External links
 

Castles in Haute-Garonne
Monuments historiques of Haute-Garonne
Ruined castles in Occitania (administrative region)